'Malibu Junction', also known as Whizin's Row after pioneer entrepreneur Art Whizin, is an Agoura Hills neighborhood in southern Agoura Hills, western Los Angeles County, California.

Malibu Junction is located in the eastern Conejo Valley between the Simi Hills and the Santa Monica Mountains. This district is on the Ventura Freeway (U.S. Route 101), and straddles the border between metropolitan Los Angeles to the east, and Ventura County to the northwest.

History
Originally Wizen's (Malibu Junction) was a travelers stop on along old 2 lane Route 101, centered around Art Wizen's businesses. In 1953 he bought  of the northern Paramount Ranch property, and established a little 12-stool, three-table hamburger stand with a couple of Mobile Oil Co. gasoline pumps out front. Soon he built a rodeo arena and held rodeos every Sunday. That lasted three years, then came motorcycle racing, and then midget car racing.

Present
The Malibu Junction district has recently become Agoura Hills's entertainment center, with a movie theater, popular restaurants, clubs, and a hotel built in the 2000s.  The new construction has expanded the district southward across Agoura Road, edging into the rustic Santa Monica Mountains. 

Agoura Hills is called the "Gateway to the Santa Monica Mountains National Recreation Area". Malibu Junction, at the junction of the Ventura Freeway and southbound Kanan-Dume Road, is a primary Entrance to the Parks,

Future
A proposed major development project for a large parcel along Agoura Road and Roadside Drive west of Kanan Road, included a master planned community using the principles of New Urbanism. In 2006 it was in a preliminary planning phase. The local and regional negative community impacts, and environmental degradation would be significant from such a project, and would need in depth environmental impact assessment studies to produce an environmental impact statement (EIR), providing for the community, Planning Department, and elected representatives to review, discuss, and make decisions upon.

References

External links
 Agoura Hills official website
 Santa Monica Mountains Conservancy
 Agoura Hills community History — Los Angeles County Library
 NPS Official Site for the Santa Monica Mountains National Recreation Area

Neighborhoods in Agoura Hills, California
Shopping malls in the San Fernando Valley